MicroRNA (miRNA) precursor miR156 is a family of plant non-coding RNA. This microRNA has now been predicted or experimentally confirmed in a range of plant species (MIPF0000008).  Animal miRNAs are transcribed as ~70 nucleotide precursors and subsequently processed by the Dicer enzyme to give a ~22 nucleotide product. miR156 functions in the induction of flowering by suppressing the transcripts of SQUAMOSA-PROMOTER BINDING LIKE (SPL) transcription factors gene family. It was suggested that the loading into ARGONAUTE1 and ARGONAUTE5 is required for miR156 functionality in Arabidopsis thaliana.  In plants the precursor sequences may be longer, and the carpel factory (caf) enzyme appears to be involved in processing.  In this case the mature sequence comes from the 5' arm of the precursor, and both Arabidopsis thaliana and rice genomes contain a number of related miRNA precursors which give rise to almost identical mature sequences.  The extents of the hairpin precursors are not generally known and are estimated based on hairpin prediction. The products are thought to have regulatory roles through complementarity to mRNA.

This miRNA is involved in control of reproductive structures in liverworts.

References

Further reading

External links 
 
 MIPF0000008

MicroRNA